In physics, the plane-wave expansion expresses a plane wave as a linear combination of spherical waves:

where
  is the imaginary unit,
  is a wave vector of length ,
  is a position vector of length ,
  are spherical Bessel functions,
  are Legendre polynomials, and
 the hat  denotes the unit vector.

In the special case where  is aligned with the z axis,

Expansion in spherical harmonics 

With the spherical-harmonic addition theorem the equation can be rewritten as

where
  are the spherical harmonics and
 the superscript  denotes complex conjugation.

Note that the complex conjugation can be interchanged between the two spherical harmonics due to symmetry.

Applications

The plane wave expansion is applied in
 Acoustics
 Optics
 S-matrix

See also

 Helmholtz equation
 Plane wave expansion method in computational electromagnetism
 Weyl expansion

References

Scattering
Mathematical physics